796 Sarita is a minor planet orbiting the Sun. It was discovered 15 October 1914 by German astronomer Karl W. Reinmuth. The orbital plane is inclined at an angle of 19.052° from the plane of the ecliptic. Tholen (1989) initially classified it as type XD, although later authors treated it as an M-class body. The object's visual albedo is considered characteristic of the latter type. It has a significantly higher radar albedo than most main belt objects, which also suggests a higher metallic content.

References

External links 
 
 

000796
Discoveries by Karl Wilhelm Reinmuth
Named minor planets
000796
000796
19141015